The Juno Award for "Folk Artist of the Year" was awarded from 1971 - 1982 as recognition each year for the best new folk artist/musician in Canada.

Winners

Top Folk Singer (1971 - 1971)

Folksinger of the Year (1972 - 1979)

Folk Artist of the Year (1980 - 1982)

References

Folk Artist

Folk music awards